Marc Silverstein (born July 1, 1971) is an American screenwriter, producer and film director.

Biography
Silverstein was born to a Jewish family.
His writing partner is Abby Kohn. They are known for co-writing romantic comedy films such as Never Been Kissed, He's Just Not That Into You, How to Be Single, and the story for Valentine's Day. Their first co-directing project was I Feel Pretty starring Amy Schumer. They also co-wrote the romantic drama film The Vow.

Personal life
Silverstein married actress Busy Philipps on June 16, 2007 and they have two children, Cricket Pearl and Birdie Leigh. They separated in February 2021.

Filmography

With Abby Kohn

Reference list

External links

1971 births
American male screenwriters
American television producers
American male film actors
20th-century American Jews
American film directors
Living people
Place of birth missing (living people)
20th-century American screenwriters
20th-century American male writers
21st-century American screenwriters
21st-century American male writers
21st-century American Jews